David Manning Foster is an Australian novelist and scientist. He has written a range of satires on the theme of the decline of Western civilization and produced short stories, poetry, essays, and several radio plays.

Early life and education 
David Manning Foster was born on in the Blue Mountains in New South Wales, Australia to George and Hazel (née Manning) Foster, vaudeville and radio performers who separated before his birth. He spent his early years in Katoomba, raised by his mother and maternal grandparents. In 1950, Foster spent six months in Katoomba Hospital recovering from poliomyelitis, a disease that left him with a slight limp. His mother married a bank officer and Foster attended high schools in Sydney (Fort Street High School), Armidale (Armidale High School), and Orange (Orange High School) as the family moved from city to country towns. At Orange High, Foster began playing drums professionally in a jazz dance band.

In 1961, Foster commenced an Arts degree at the University of Sydney in Sydney, but he left studies after a year to work and travel. A year thereafter, in 1963, he return to the University to study chemistry at the University of Sydney School of Chemistry.

Foster worked part-time as a musician and as an engineer at Marrickville Council while he completed his Bachelor of Science in Chemistry. He was awarded the University Medal for Inorganic Chemistry in 1967 and moved to Canberra for a PhD in Biological Inorganic Chemistry at the Australian National University, from which he graduated in 1970.

Career

Scientific and early literary career 
At the end of this degree, he went to Philadelphia, Pennsylvania in the United States to pursue postdoctoral studies at the Institute for Cancer Research at the University of Pennsylvania.

He began to write his first novellas, later published in North South West (1973). Back in Sydney in 1972, he worked as a Research Officer in the Department of Medicine, University of Sydney, before abandoning science for a career as a novelist. Since then, he has supported himself and his family by various work as a pool attendant, musician, postman, truck driver, martial arts instructor and trawler fisherman After the publication of North South West by Macmillan, Foster was awarded an Australia Council for the Arts Fellowship.

Literary career 

Foster's first collection of novellas was well-received, and his first novel, The Pure Land (1974), won the inaugural The Age Book of the Year prize. The story is intensely autobiographical as it traces the experiences of the young scientist Danny Harris in America and Australia. At the novel's end, Danny has abandoned science and appears to be inventing the novel in which he is a character. His grandfather, Albert Manwaring, has left his life as a photographer in Katoomba to seek success and, finally, spiritual purity in America; Danny, born in America, reverses the journey to find a Pure Land in Australia. The novel satirises the grasping materialism of America and the backward colonialism of Australia. Another collection of stories followed this novel, Escape to Reality (1977), which pursued Foster's interest in male irresponsibility and the paradoxes of science and art. With a fellow scientist at the Australian National University, called 'D.K. Lyall' (Des Kirk), Foster published The Empathy Experiment (1977), a strange exploration of paranoia in the context of scientific experiments in empathy.

A 1978 Marten Bequest Travelling Scholarship enabled Foster to travel to Scotland to research Moonlite (1981), his acclaimed satire on colonialism, which places the experiences of Scottish islanders during the clearances of the nineteenth century in paradoxical comparison with the colonising of Australia at the same time. Plumbum (1983) uses Foster's experience in jazz bands to satirise the contemporary Western adulation of rock musicians, contrasting this enthusiasm with the various religions of Bangkok and India. The Adventures of Christian Rosy Cross (1985) is a burlesque historical satire on the paradoxes of religious belief following the picaresque adventures of Christians as he searches for the philosopher's stone. Dog Rock: a Postal Pastoral (1985) offers a more benign comedy as Foster examines the trivia of an Australian country town like Bundanoon. A second Dog Rock novel, The Pale Blue Crochet Coathanger Cover (1988), continues this nostalgic view of a disappearing rural life with particular reference to the misuse of animals. In 2012, Foster published a third Dog Rock novel, Man of Letters. Testosterone (1987), inspired by a residence in Venice in 1984, uses the convention of the separated twins to satirise the cultural differences between Britain and Australia, with a third possibility represented by Italy. Among its many allusions and parodies, the novel invokes the traditions of Carnivale and Carlo Goldoni's play, The Venetian Twins.

After the Australian Bicentennial celebrations of 1988, Foster published his satire of the state of contemporary Australia in Mates of Mars (1991). The novel follows martial arts enthusiasts travelling from Sydney to the Northern Territory and encountering spiritualism that challenges their beliefs and attitudes. The characters represent a multicultural Australia and demonstrate the novel's premise that 'Australians are not just members of the internal proletariat of...Western Christian Civilisation (a civilisation now decrepit that can never take Colonials seriously) but also, in certain key aspects chiefly, but not exclusively, economic, barbarian members of the external proletariat of the Sinic Mahayana Buddhist Civilisation, in its Westernised Japanese/Korean/Colonial Chinese branch, on the southernmost march of that civilisation.

Foster used the support of an Australian government Creative Fellowship awarded in 1991 (a 'Keating' award) to research his monumental The Glade Within the Grove (1996). Narrated by the postman of Dog Rock, D’Arcy D’Oliveres, this novel examines the destruction of the native forests of Australia and the decline of Christianity in the context of pre-Christian religious beliefs. Set mainly in the 'revolutionary' year of 1968, the novel speculates about a group of hippies who set up a commune in the South Eastern forests of Australia. The novel's accompanying poem,The Ballad of Erinungerah, claims to be the work of a child of the commune and describes the visit of the goddess, Brigid, and her demand that the men castrate themselves. The novel celebrates the forests in lyrical descriptions, satirises the stupidity of the communards and translates snatches of classic texts into Australian vernacular. It is celebratory, satirical and elegiac. Later, Foster published under his own name an essay 'On Castration' in Heat magazine, that incorporated part of the novel as it argued that male sexuality is a destructive force that needs to be controlled. This obsession is evident in all Foster's work after Mates of Mars. His novel In the New Country offers a comic and despairing view of the decline of rural life in Australia, comparing it to the corresponding decline of spirituality in the Old Country of Ireland.  The Land Where Stories End is a fairytale about a woodcutter in Ireland who goes on an impossible quest for spiritual purity.

In 2009, Foster published Sons of the Rumour, his most ambitious and original novel. Modelled on the One Thousand and One Nights structure, it changes the storyteller's role from Shahrazad to a group of men travelling through the 7th-century city of Merv. Richard Burton's Arabian Nights are transformed into Iranian days. Foster creates a comic structure for the stories with his rather Australian bickering couple, the Shah and Shahrazad. Still, the stories are imaginative adventures, sometimes puzzling, sometimes grotesque and often wondrous. For example, 'The Mine in the Moon' imagines a world without women, where boys grow up without maternal comfort; 'The Tears of the Fish' describes an orgy and castration ritual; 'The Gilt Felt Yurt' measures the loss of freedom in the creation of civilization and settlement. In the stories, the Shah undergoes an education in spiritualism and sexual understanding. A final section of the novel moves to the present day, where a modern man undergoes a visionary experience in Ireland. Reviewing the story for Australian Book Review, James Ley concluded, 'There is simply no one remotely like him in contemporary Australian fiction. He is so far ahead of everyone else that it is not funny. Except that it is weird—very, very funny.

Personal life 
In 1964, Foster married his Orange High girlfriend, Robin Bowers, with whom he had three children; Samantha (b. 1968), Natalie (b. 1969), and Seth (b. 1973).

In 1974, he left his wife and family to live with Gerda Busch, the singer in the Canberra jazz band where he played drums. They moved to the country town of Bundanoon, where they married and had three children, Antigone (b. 1975), Levi (b. 1976), and Zoe Foster Blake (b. 1980). Foster worked as a postman at Bundanoon for many years, and his Dog Rock novels provide a comic version of the town.

Awards 
1974: The Age Book of the Year Book of the Year and Imaginative Writing Award for The Pure Land
1975: Barbara Ramsden Award for The Pure Land
1981: National Book Council Book of the Year for Moonlite
1991: Australian Government Creative Fellowship (Keating)
1997: Miles Franklin Award for The Glade Within the Grove (It was translated into German)
1999: Courier-Mail Book of the Year for In the New Country
1999: joint winner (with Bruce Pascoe) of the FAW Australian Literature Award for In the New Country
2010: Patrick White Award

Selected works 
Novels
 The Pure Land (Macmillan, 1974)
 The Empathy Experiment co-authored with D.K. Lyall (Wild & Woolley, 1977)
 Moonlite (Macmillan, 1981)
 Plumbum (Penguin, 1983)
 Dog Rock: A Postal Pastoral (Dog Rock #1; Penguin, 1985)
 The Adventures of Christian Rosy Cross (Penguin, 1986)
 Testostero: A Comic Novel (Penguin, 1987)
 The Pale Blue Crochet Coathanger Cover (Dog Rock #2; Penguin, 1988)
 Mates of Mars (Penguin, 1991)
 The Glade Within the Grove (Vintage, 1996)
 In the New Country (Fourth Estate, 1999)
 The Land Where Stories End (Duffy & Snellgrove, 2002)
 Sons of the Rumour (Picador, 2009)
 Man of Letters (Dog Rock #3; Puncher & Wattmann, 2012)
 The Contemptuary (Puncher & Wattmann, 2018)
Short Stories and Novellas
 North South West: Three Novellas (Macmillan, 1973)
 Escape to Reality (Macmillan, 1977) - short story collection
 Hitting the Wall: Two Novellas (Penguin, 1989)
Poetry
 The Fleeing Atalanta (Maximus, 1975)
 The Ballad of Erinungarah (Vintage, 1997)
 Sunset at Santorini (Puncher & Wattman, 2012)
Non-fiction
 Studs and Nogs: Essays 1987–98 (Vintage, 1999)
 A Year of Slow Food with Gerda Foster (Duffy & Snellgrove, 2002)
 The Niquab and the Mumkin (Puncher & Wattman, 2014)

References

Further reading 
Helen Daniel. 'The Alchemy of the Lie: David Foster', in her Liars: Australian New Novelists Penguin, Melbourne, 1988 pp. 77–104.
Ken Gelder. 'The "Self-contradictory" Fiction of David Foster' in Aspects of Australian Fiction, edited by Alan Brissenden, University of Western Australia Press, Perth, 1990 pp. 149–159.
Stephen Harris. 'David Foster's Moonlite: Re-viewing History as Satirical Fable—Towards a Post-Colonial Past' Westerly 42.1 (1997) pp. 71–88.
Susan Lever. David Foster: the Satirist of Australia Cambria Press, Youngstown, 2008.
Marilla North.'Postman's Knock: Is David Foster a Clever Dick—or What?' Meanjin 56.3/4 (1997) pp. 686–696.
Andrew Riemer. 'Bare Breeched Brethren: the Novels of David Foster' Southerly 47.2 (1987) pp. 126–144.
Narelle Shaw. 'The Postman's Grand Narrative: Postmodernism and David Foster's The Glade Within the Grove' Journal of Commonwealth Literature 34.1 (1999) pp. 45–64.

External links 
 Brief Biography & about some of the novels
 David Foster discusses The Land Where Stories End
 Critical study Susan Lever's critical study David Foster: Satirist of Australia (Cambria, 2008)
 Susan Lever, Displaced from the Sacred Sites: David Foster’s In the New Country and The Land Where Stories End JASAL 8, 2008.
 Susan Lever, 'A Masculine Crisis: David Foster's Mates of Mars ' in her Real Relations: The Feminist Politics of Form in Australian Fiction Halstead Press, Sydney, 2000, pp. 120–130.
 Review of The Niquab and the Mumkin by B. J. Muirhead  in The Rochford Street Review
  Review of Sunset on Santorini by Robbie Coburn in The Rochford Street Review

Living people
Australian chemists
Australian medical researchers
Australian National University alumni
Australian poets
Miles Franklin Award winners
Patrick White Award winners
People educated at Fort Street High School
People educated at Orange High School (New South Wales)
People from Katoomba, New South Wales
University of Sydney alumni
University of Pennsylvania people
Writers from New South Wales
20th-century Australian novelists
20th-century Australian male writers
21st-century Australian novelists
Australian male poets
Australian male novelists
21st-century Australian male writers
Year of birth missing (living people)